Four Weddings and a Funeral is a 1994 British romantic comedy film directed by Mike Newell. It is the first of several films by screenwriter Richard Curtis to feature Hugh Grant, and follows the adventures of Charles (Grant) and his circle of friends through a number of social occasions as they each encounter romance. Andie MacDowell stars as Charles's love interest Carrie, with Kristin Scott Thomas, James Fleet, Simon Callow, John Hannah, Charlotte Coleman, David Bower, Corin Redgrave, and Rowan Atkinson in supporting roles.

The film was made in six weeks, cost under £3 million, and became an unexpected success and the highest-grossing British film in history at the time, with worldwide box office total of $245.7 million, and receiving Academy Award nominations for Best Picture and Best Original Screenplay. Additionally, Grant won the Golden Globe Award for Best Actor - Motion Picture Musical or Comedy and the BAFTA Award for Best Actor in a Leading Role, and the film won the BAFTA Awards Best Film, Best Direction, and Best Actress in a Supporting Role for Scott Thomas. The film's success propelled Hugh Grant to international stardom, particularly in the United States.

In 1999, Four Weddings and a Funeral was placed 23rd on the British Film Institute's 100 greatest British films of the 20th century. In 2016, Empire magazine ranked it 21st in their list of the 100 best British films. A 2017 poll of 150 actors, directors, writers, producers, and critics for Time Out magazine ranked it the 74th best British film ever.

Curtis reunited director Newell and the surviving cast for a 25th anniversary reunion Comic Relief short entitled One Red Nose Day and a Wedding, which aired in the UK during Red Nose Day on 15 March 2019.

Plot
At the wedding of Angus and Laura in Somerset, the unmarried best man Charles; his flatmate Scarlett; his friend Fiona and her brother, Tom; Gareth and his partner Matthew; and Charles's deaf brother, David, endure the festivities. At the reception, Charles is attracted to Carrie, a young American who has been working in England. They spend the night together. In the morning, Carrie, who is returning to the U.S., laments they may have "missed a great opportunity".

Three months later at the London wedding of Bernard and Lydia – who became an item at the previous wedding – Charles is excited to run into Carrie, who has returned to the U.K. He is quickly disappointed after meeting the snobbish Hamish, Carrie's much older Scottish fiancé. During the reception, Charles experiences further humiliation from several ex-girlfriends, including the distraught Henrietta, who angrily claims Charles is a "serial monogamist" and fears commitment. He retreats to an empty hotel suite where he sees Carrie and Hamish depart by taxi. He becomes trapped in the room when the newlyweds stumble in to have sex. Carrie returns to the reception, and she and Charles spend another night together.

A month later, Charles receives an invitation to Carrie's wedding. While shopping for a gift, he runs into her. While Charles helps Carrie look for a wedding dress, she recounts her 33 sexual partners; Charles, who was number 32, awkwardly confesses he loves her, which Carrie reluctantly rebuffs.

A month later, Charles and his friends attend Carrie and Hamish's wedding in Perthshire. The gregarious Gareth instructs the group to seek potential mates; Scarlett meets Chester, an American from Texas. As Charles watches Carrie and Hamish dance, Fiona deduces his heartbreak. She tells him that she remains single because she has long been in love with him; though sympathetic, Charles does not reciprocate her feelings. During Hamish's toast, Gareth suffers a fatal heart attack.

At Gareth's funeral, Matthew recites "Funeral Blues", a poem by British-American poet W. H. Auden. Carrie and Charles share a brief moment and, later, Charles and Tom ponder that despite their clique's pride in being single, Gareth and Matthew were as a "married" couple. They wonder whether the search for "one true love" is futile.

Ten months later, Charles's own wedding day arrives; his bride is Henrietta. While seating guests, Tom meets and is immediately smitten with his distant-cousin, Deirdre, whom he has not seen since childhood. Carrie arrives and tells Charles that she and Hamish have separated following a difficult marriage. Charles, stunned, privately has an emotional crisis. After brother David and Matthew counsel him, Charles resolves to proceed with the wedding. During the ceremony, the vicar asks if anyone present has any reason why the couple should not marry; David interrupts and, using sign language, says the groom has doubts and loves someone else. Charles confirms this, and Henrietta angrily punches him, halting the ceremony.

A few hours later, Carrie arrives at Charles' flat and apologizes for causing the fiasco. Charles says he loves Carrie and proposes a lifelong commitment without marriage, which Carrie accepts. As they kiss, a thunderbolt flashes across the sky.
 
In an ending photo montage, Henrietta has married an officer in the Grenadier Guards; David married Serena, whom he met at the second wedding; Scarlett has married Chester, the Texan at Carrie and Hamish's wedding; Tom married Deirdre; Matthew has found a new partner; Fiona is shown with Prince Charles; and Charles and Carrie have had their first child.

Cast

Production

Writing
Screenwriter Richard Curtis's own experiences as a wedding attendee inspired Four Weddings and a Funeral. According to Curtis he began writing the script at age 34, after realising he had attended 65 weddings in an 11-year period. At one wedding he was propositioned by a fellow guest, but he turned her down and forever regretted it; accordingly he based the origin of Charles and Carrie's romance on that situation.

It took Curtis 17 drafts to reach the final version. He has commented on director Mike Newell's influence; "I come from a school where making it funny is what matters. Mike was obsessed with keeping it real. Every character, no matter how small, has a story, not just three funny lines. It's a romantic film about love and friendship that swims in a sea of jokes."

Curtis chose to omit any mention of the characters' careers, because he didn't think a group of friends would realistically discuss their jobs while together at a wedding.

Casting
Curtis, Newell and the producers began the casting process for Four Weddings in early 1992. Alex Jennings was cast as Charles, but funding for the production fell through in mid-1992. Jennings would eventually go on to play a supporting role in Mindy Kaling's 2019 television miniseries adaptation of the film. The team continued holding auditions for over a year, seeing roughly 70 actors for the role of Charles before Hugh Grant.

Grant was ready to give up acting as a career when he received the script for Four Weddings and a Funeral; he stated in 2016 that: "I wasn't really getting any work at all, and then to my great surprise this script came through the letterbox from my agent, and it was really good. And I rang on and said there must be a mistake, you've sent me a good script." Initially, writer Richard Curtis, who had modelled the character of Charles after himself, was opposed to casting Grant in the role, because he thought Grant was too handsome. Curtis favoured casting Alan Rickman, but Rickman refused to audition. Curtis was eventually persuaded by Newell and the producers to approve Grant's casting.

Jeanne Tripplehorn was originally cast as Carrie, but she had to drop out before filming when her mother passed away. The role was offered to Marisa Tomei, but she turned it down, because her grandfather was sick at the time. Sarah Jessica Parker was also reportedly considered. Andie MacDowell was in London doing publicity for Groundhog Day when she read the script  and was subsequently cast. MacDowell took a 75% cut in her fee to appear, receiving $250,000 upfront, but due to the success of the film, she earned around $3 million.

Grant's participation hit another stumbling block when his agent requested a £5,000 rise over the £35,000 salary Grant was offered. The producers initially refused because of the extremely tight budget, but eventually agreed. The supporting cast-members were paid £17,500 apiece.

Production
Duncan Kenworthy produced the film while on sabbatical from Jim Henson Productions. Pre-production for the movie was a long process because funding was erratic, falling through in mid-1992 and leading to much uncertainty. Finally in early 1993, Working Title Films stepped in to close the gap. Nonetheless, another $1.2 million was cut just before production began in the summer of 1993, forcing the film to be made in just 36 days with a final budget of £2.7 million (appr. $4.4 million in 1994). Channel Four Films contributed £800,000. The budget was so tight that extras had to wear their own wedding clothes, while Rowan Atkinson appeared as a vicar at two of the weddings so production wouldn't have to pay another actor.

Future Home Secretary and Member of Parliament (MP) Amber Rudd was given the credit of "Aristocracy Coordinator" after she arranged for several aristocrats to make uncredited appearances as wedding extras, including Peregrine Cavendish, who was at the time Marquess of Hartington, and the Earl of Woolton, who conveniently wore their own morning suits.

To make Grant look more nerdy, the producers styled him with shaggy hair, glasses, and deliberately unflattering, ill-fitting clothes. Grant was encouraged by director Mike Newell to mess up and trip over his lines, written in "convoluted syntax" as Grant describes them, in order to give Charles a stammering, nervous quality. Grant, who struggled with hay fever throughout filming, was unsure of Newell's direction and his own performance, which he thought was "atrocious."  Regarding Newell, Grant commented that: "He seemed to be giving direction against what I thought were the natural beats of the comedy. He was making a film with texture, grounding it, playing the truths rather than the gags".

The film was shot mainly in London and the Home Counties, including: Hampstead, Islington where the final moments take place on Highbury Terrace, Greenwich Hospital, Betchworth in Surrey, Amersham in Buckinghamshire, St Bartholomew-the-Great (wedding number four) and West Thurrock in Essex. 

Exterior shots of guests arriving for the funeral were filmed in Thurrock, Essex overlooking the River Thames with the backdrop of the Dartford River Crossing.  Stately homes in Bedfordshire (Luton Hoo for wedding two's reception) and Hampshire provided exteriors for weddings.

Post-production
According to Hugh Grant, the initial screening of a rough-cut of Four Weddings went very badly. 

Throughout production, Gramercy Pictures, the U.S. distributor for the film, sent frequent transatlantic faxes objecting to the explicit language and sexual content, fearing the final product would not be suitable for American distribution or television airings. They particularly objected to the opening scene of the movie, in which Charles and Scarlett say the word "Fuck" over and over, after an initial screening of the movie in Salt Lake City led the conservative Mormon members of the city council to walk out. Accordingly, Mike Newell and the actors agreed to reshoot the scene with the British swear word "Bugger" to be used in the American version. The executives also objected to the title, believing Four Weddings and a Funeral would turn off male viewers from the film. In its place they suggested such titles as True Love and Near Misses, Loitering in Sacred Places, Skulking Around, and Rolling in the Aisles, none of which were accepted.

Music and soundtrack
The original score was composed by British composer Richard Rodney Bennett. The movie also featured a soundtrack of popular songs, including a cover version of The Troggs' "Love Is All Around" performed by Wet Wet Wet that remained at number 1 on the UK Singles Chart for fifteen weeks and was then the ninth (now twelfth) biggest selling single of all time in Britain. This song would later be adapted into "Christmas Is All Around" and sung by the character of Billy Mack in Richard Curtis' 2003 film Love Actually, in which Grant also stars. The soundtrack album sold more than 750,000 units.

Release
Four Weddings and a Funeral had its world premiere in January 1994 at the Sundance Film Festival in Salt Lake City, Utah.

It opened in the United States on 11 March 1994 in five theatres. The box office receipts from the first five days of the film's general release in the United States so impressed the movie's distributor that it decided to spend lavishly on promotion, buying full-page newspaper ads and TV-spots totaling some $11 million. The movie also benefited from much free publicity because of Grant's reception in the United States, where he became an instant sex symbol and undertook a successful media tour promoting the film. Producer Duncan Kenworthy stated that "It was the most amazing luck that when Hugh went on the publicity trail he turned out to be incredibly funny, and very like the character of Charles. That doesn't ever happen." The film had a wide release in the United States on 15 April 1994.

At the UK premiere in Leicester Square on 11 May 1994,  Hugh Grant's then-girlfriend Elizabeth Hurley garnered much publicity for the film when she wore a black Versace safety-pin dress which became a sensation in the press. The film opened in the UK on 13 May 1994.

Reception

Critical response
On review aggregator Rotten Tomatoes the film holds an approval rating of 96% based on 69 reviews, with an average rating of 7.7/10. The site's critics consensus states, "While frothy to a fault, Four Weddings and a Funeral features irresistibly breezy humor, and winsome performances from Hugh Grant and Andie MacDowell." Metacritic assigned the film a weighted average score of 81 out of 100 based on 19 critics, indicating "universal acclaim".

Film critic Roger Ebert gave the film three-and-a-half stars out of four, calling it "delightful and sly", and directed with "light-hearted enchantment" by Newell. He praised Grant's performance, describing it as a kind of "endearing awkwardness". Todd McCarthy of Variety called it a "truly beguiling romantic comedy" which was "frequently hilarious without being sappily sentimental or tiresomely retrograde." Producer Duncan Kenworthy later attributed much of the success of Four Weddings at the box office to McCarthy's review.

Writing for the Chicago Reader, Jonathan Rosenbaum called the film "generic" and "standard issue", stating that the audience shouldn't "expect to remember it ten minutes later". Time magazine writer Richard Corliss was less scathing, but agreed that it was forgettable, saying that people would "forget all about [the movie] by the time they leave the multiplex," even joking at the end of his review that he had forgotten the film's name.

Box office
Upon its limited release in the United States, Four Weddings and a Funeral opened with $138,486 from five theatres. In its wide release, the film topped the box office with $4.2 million. The film would go on to gross $52.7 million in the United States and Canada.

In the United Kingdom, the film grossed £1.4 million in its opening weekend, a record for a UK production, and £2.7 million in its opening week from 211 theatres. It was number one for nine consecutive weeks, grossing £27.8 million, making it the second highest-grossing film of all-time in the United Kingdom behind Jurassic Park. It surpassed A Fish Called Wanda as the highest-grossing British film. In France, it was number one at the box office for ten weeks, grossing $34.4 million. It was also number one at the Australian box office for five weeks and was the second-highest-grossing film of the year, grossing $A21.4 million. Overall, it grossed $245.7 million worldwide, generating the highest percentage return on cost of films released in 1994. The success of the film cleared Working Title's past losses and generated over $50 million for Polygram, clearing most of their losses in the four years since they started producing films.

Recognition
The film was voted the 27th greatest comedy film of all time by readers of Total Film in 2000. In 2004, the same magazine named it the 34th greatest British film of all time. It is number 96 on Bravo's "100 Funniest Movies".

The Guardian, in a 20th anniversary retrospective of Four Weddings, stated that "Its influence on the British film industry, on romantic-comedy writing, on the pop charts, on funeral readings, on haircuts, was enormous."

Hugh Grant commented in 2016 on the experience of the film's phenomenal success and its effect on his career: "I was making An Awfully Big Adventure at the time that Four Weddings came out, with Mike Newell again, same director, even tinier budget, in Dublin. And we'd get back from brutal days on the set, very long and no money, and the fax machines...were coming out saying that now your film Four Weddings is #5 in America, now it's #3, now it's #1 and here's an offer Hugh, for Captain Blood and they'll pay you $1 million. It was completely surreal."

Awards and accolades

Year-end lists 

 1st –  Glenn Lovell, San Jose Mercury News
 2nd – Sandi Davis, The Oklahoman
 3rd – National Board of Review
 5th – Joan Vadeboncoeur, Syracuse Herald American
 5th – John Hurley, Staten Island Advance
 6th – Peter Travers, Rolling Stone
 6th – Sean P. Means, The Salt Lake Tribune
 7th – Michael MacCambridge, Austin American-Statesman
 7th – Kenneth Turan, Los Angeles Times
 7th – Janet Maslin, The New York Times
 7th – Todd Anthony, Miami New Times
 7th – Steve Persall, St. Petersburg Times
 8th – James Berardinelli, ReelViews
 8th – Mack Bates, The Milwaukee Journal
 10th – Kevin Thomas, Los Angeles Times
 10th – Douglas Armstrong, The Milwaukee Journal
 Top 7 (not ranked) – Duane Dudek, Milwaukee Sentinel
 Top 9 (not ranked) – Dan Webster, The Spokesman-Review
 Top 10 (listed alphabetically, not ranked) – Bob Ross, The Tampa Tribune
 Top 10 (listed alphabetically, not ranked) – Eleanor Ringel, The Atlanta Journal-Constitution
 Top 10 (not ranked) – Howie Movshovitz, The Denver Post
 Top 10 (not ranked) – George Meyer, The Ledger
 Top 10 (not ranked) – Bob Carlton, The Birmingham News
 Best "sleepers" (not ranked) – Dennis King, Tulsa World
 Honorable mention – Betsy Pickle, Knoxville News-Sentinel
 Honorable mention –  William Arnold, Seattle Post-Intelligencer
 Honorable mention – David Elliott, The San Diego Union-Tribune
 Honorable mention – Robert Denerstein, Rocky Mountain News
 Honorable mention – Michael Mills, The Palm Beach Post
 Honorable mention – Jeff Simon, The Buffalo News

Awards

Franchise

Hulu anthology television miniseries

It was reported in November 2017 that the streaming service Hulu was developing an eponymous anthology television series based upon the film, to be written and executive produced by Mindy Kaling and Matt Warburton, with Richard Curtis also serving as an executive producer. In October 2018, it was announced Jessica Williams, Nikesh Patel, Rebecca Rittenhouse, and John Reynolds had joined the cast. The miniseries premiered on 31 July 2019.

One Red Nose Day and a Wedding
On 5 December 2018, it was announced that Richard Curtis had written One Red Nose Day and a Wedding, a 25th anniversary Comic Relief television reunion short film. The original film's director, Mike Newell, returned, along with the film's surviving cast, including Hugh Grant, Andie MacDowell, Kristin Scott Thomas, John Hannah, Rowan Atkinson, James Fleet, David Haig, Sophie Thompson, David Bower, Robin McCaffrey, Anna Chancellor, Rupert Vansittart, Simon Kunz, Sara Crowe and Timothy Walker. It was filmed on 13–14 December 2018 at St James' Church, Islington, London. It centered on the reunion of all the characters from the original film at the wedding of Charles and Carrie's daughter to Fiona's daughter. The involvement of additional cast members Lily James and Alicia Vikander was not announced until the day the film aired in the UK, because they played the young women getting married. The film aired in the US on their Red Nose Day on Thursday 23 May 2019.

See also
 BFI Top 100 British films
 Notting Hill (1999), also written by Curtis and starring Grant
 Love Actually (2003), another film by Curtis starring Grant and Atkinson 
 Black Versace dress of Elizabeth Hurley, worn by Hurley to the film's premiere
 List of films featuring the deaf and hard of hearing
 Parey Hut Love

References

External links

 
 
 
 
 
 

1994 films
1994 comedy-drama films
1994 LGBT-related films
1994 romantic comedy films
1994 romantic drama films
1990s romantic comedy-drama films
BAFTA winners (films)
Best Film BAFTA Award winners
Best Foreign Film César Award winners
British LGBT-related films
British romantic comedy-drama films
British Sign Language films
Film4 Productions films
Films about funerals
Films about weddings in the United Kingdom
Films directed by Mike Newell
1994 independent films
1990s British films
Working Title Films films
Films featuring a Best Musical or Comedy Actor Golden Globe winning performance
1990s English-language films
Films scored by Richard Rodney Bennett
Films set in London
Films set in Scotland
Films set in Somerset
Films shot at Shepperton Studios
Films shot in Bedfordshire
Films shot in Buckinghamshire
Films shot in Essex
Films shot in Hampshire
Films shot in London
Films whose director won the Best Direction BAFTA Award
Films with screenplays by Richard Curtis
Gay-related films
LGBT-related romantic comedy-drama films
PolyGram Filmed Entertainment films